The  is a  railway line in Kyoto Prefecture, Japan, operated by the West Japan Railway Company (JR West). It connects Ayabe and Higashi-Maizuru, the line beyond there being called the Obama Line connecting to Tsuruga.

Stations
Local trains stop at every station and rapid trains at the stations marked "S".

History
The line opened in the autumn of 1904 to transport troops and materiel to the naval base and Maizuru-Higashi Port during the Russo-Japanese War, which commenced in February of that year. Although built by the Japanese Government, it was initially leased to the Bantsuru Railway Co, which opened the Ayabe – Fukuchiyama section of what is now the Sanin Main Line the same year.

The company was nationalised in 1907, the year the 2 km  from Nishi-Maizuru to Maizuru Port opened. Passenger services operated on that branch between 1913 and 1924, and it closed in 1985.

Nishi-Maizuru was also the junction for the 4 km  to Naka-Maizuru which operated between 1919 and 1972.

The line was electrified in 1999.

References

Lines of West Japan Railway Company
Rail transport in Kyoto Prefecture
1067 mm gauge railways in Japan
Railway lines opened in 1904